The 2004–05 season was Levski Sofia's 83rd season in the First League. This article shows player statistics and all matches (official and friendly) that the club has played during the 2004–05 season.

First-team squad
Squad at end of season

Competitions

A Group

Table

Results summary

Results by round

Fixtures and results

Bulgarian Cup

Levski advanced to Round 3.

Levski advanced to Quarterfinals.

Levski advanced to Semifinals.

Levski advanced to the Final with 4-1 on aggregate.

Levski wins the Bulgarian Cup 2005.

UEFA Cup

Second qualifying round

First Round

References

External links 
 2004–05 Levski Sofia season

PFC Levski Sofia seasons
Levski Sofia